Vamping Venus is a 1928 American comedy film directed by Edward F. Cline, written by Howard J. Green and Ralph Spence, and starring Charles Murray, Louise Fazenda, Thelma Todd, Russ Powell, Joe Bonomo and Guinn "Big Boy" Williams. It was released on May 13, 1928, by First National Pictures.

Plot
A present-day stereotypically-Irish American politician ('Charlie Murray') is vaulted into ancient Greece after receiving a bump on the head.

Cast       
Charles Murray as Michael Cassidy / King Cassidy of Ireland 
Louise Fazenda as Maggie Cassidy / Circe
Thelma Todd as Madame Vanezlos the Dancer / Venus
Russ Powell as Pete Papaglos / Bacchus
Joe Bonomo as Simonides the Strongman / Hercules
Guinn "Big Boy" Williams as Mars 
Spec O'Donnell as Western Union Boy / Mercury
Fred O'Beck as Vulcan
Gusztáv Pártos as Shopkeeper 
Gustav von Seyffertitz as Jupiter
Janet MacLeod as Juno
Yola d'Avril as Stenographer

References

External links
 

1928 films
1920s English-language films
Silent American comedy films
1928 comedy films
First National Pictures films
Films directed by Edward F. Cline
American silent feature films
American black-and-white films
1920s American films